Olivier Minne (born 18 March 1967 in Ixelles, Belgium) is a Belgian-born French television presenter, actor and producer.

Biography
Minne was born in Belgium, the son of a Belgian father and a French mother. Minne studied in Brussels, at a Jesuit school for his secondary school qualification before moving to Paris in 1989.

In Paris, Minne studied the dramatic arts at Cours Florent, shortly after his career in television began. In 1992, he started working for the French TV programme Matin Bonheur where he worked for five years in the mailroom. Following his departure in 1997, he became both presenter and co-producer of Cercle de minuit on the same channel.

For 20 years, his work has constituted an original contribution of major significance in many ways. His demonstrated skill and unparalleled creativity on the field have earned him widespread recognition. His career was marked by a nomination for a 7 d'Or award (equivalent of an Emmy Award in the United States) for Best TV Host in 2000, for his work with Universal Studios. It was the first time in the history of television that a French television presenter was nominated for his work with a major American company.

He has been a Green card holder since 2010.

Minne was the French commentator for the Eurovision Song Contest from 1995 to 1997, having previously acted as the French vote spokesperson for the 1992 and 1993 contests. Having presented Le choix gagnant (1996), Jeux sans frontières (co-hosted with Jean Riffel in 1997) and the final season of Les Écrans du savoir in 2000, he also has hosted the game show La Cible on France 2. Minne then became the host (co-host along with Sarah Lelouch from 2003 till 2005 and Anne-Gaëlle Riccio from 2006 till 2009) of the popular game show Fort Boyard, a role which he has continuously had since 2003. In 2013, he co-hosted a series special to celebrate 50 years of Intervilles. In 2014, he hosted the French version of Pyramid on France 2.

In 2016, Minne participated in season 7 of Danse avec les stars (the French version of Dancing with the Stars) where he was partnered with Katrina Patchett but finished last.

In 2017, Minne wrote a biography of Louis Jourdan: Le dernier french lover d'hollywood. (Paris: Séguier Editions. ) and has started a documentary on the French Hollywood actor.

Minne was selected to co-present the Junior Eurovision Song Contest 2021 in Paris alongside Carla Lazzari and Élodie Gossuin.

Filmography

References

External links

1967 births
Male actors from Brussels
French people of Belgian descent
Living people
French television presenters
Cours Florent alumni
French gay actors
Belgian gay actors